Substructural type systems are a family of type systems analogous to substructural logics where one or more of the structural rules are absent or only allowed under controlled circumstances. Such systems are useful for constraining access to system resources such as files, locks, and memory by keeping track of changes of state that occur and preventing invalid states.

Different substructural type systems 
Several type systems have emerged by discarding some of the structural rules of exchange, weakening, and contraction:

Ordered type systems (discard exchange, weakening and contraction): Every variable is used exactly once in the order it was introduced.
Linear type systems (allow exchange, but neither weakening nor contraction): Every variable is used exactly once.
Affine type systems (allow exchange and weakening, but not contraction): Every variable is used at most once.
Relevant type systems (allow exchange and contraction, but not weakening): Every variable is used at least once.
Normal type systems (allow exchange, weakening and contraction): Every variable may be used arbitrarily.

The explanation for affine type systems is best understood if rephrased as “every occurrence of a variable is used at most once”.

Ordered type system 
Ordered types correspond to noncommutative logic where exchange, contraction and weakening are discarded. This can be used to model stack-based memory allocation (contrast with linear types which can be used to model heap-based memory allocation). Without the exchange property, an object may only be used when at the top of the modelled stack, after which it is popped off, resulting in every variable being used exactly once in the order it was introduced.

Linear type systems 
Linear types corresponds to linear logic and ensures that objects are used exactly once. This allows the system to safely deallocate an object after its use, or to design software interfaces that guarantee a resource cannot be used once it has been closed or transitioned to a different state.

The Clean programming language makes use of uniqueness types (a variant of linear types) to help support concurrency, input/output, and in-place update of arrays.

Linear type systems allow references but not aliases. To enforce this, a reference goes out of scope after appearing on the right-hand side of an assignment, thus ensuring that only one reference to any object exists at once. Note that passing a reference as an argument to a function is a form of assignment, as the function parameter will be assigned the value inside the function, and therefore such use of a reference also causes it to go out of scope.

A linear type system is similar to C++'s unique_ptr class, which behaves like a pointer but can only be moved (i.e., not copied) in an assignment. Although the linearity constraint is checked at compile time, dereferencing an invalidated unique_ptr causes undefined behavior at run time. Similarly, the Rust language has partial support to linear types via use of lint annotations but differently from C++ the moved from variable cannot be used again.

The single-reference property makes linear type systems suitable as programming languages for quantum computing, as it reflects the no-cloning theorem of quantum states. From the category theory point of view, no-cloning is a statement that there is no diagonal functor which could duplicate states; similarly, from the combinatory logic point of view, there is no K-combinator which can destroy states. From the lambda calculus point of view, a variable x can appear exactly once in a term.

Linear type systems are the internal language of closed symmetric monoidal categories, much in the same way that simply typed lambda calculus is the language of Cartesian closed categories. More precisely, one may construct functors between the category of linear type systems and the category of closed symmetric monoidal categories.

Affine type systems 
Affine types are a version of linear types allowing to discard (i.e. not use) a resource, corresponding to affine logic. An affine resource can be used at most once, while a linear one must be used exactly once.

Relevant type system 
Relevant types correspond to relevant logic which allows exchange and contraction, but not weakening, which translates to every variable being used at least once.

Programming languages 
The following programming languages support linear or affine types:
 C++
 ATS
 Clean
 Idris
 Mercury
 F*
 LinearML
 Alms
 Haskell with Glasgow Haskell Compiler (GHC) 9.0.1 or above
 Granule
 Rust
 Nim

See also
 Effect system
 Linear logic
 Affine logic

Notes

References 
 
 
 
 

Type theory